Meenadom is a village in Kottayam, Kerala, India.

Demographics 
 India census, Meenadom had a population of 13065 with 6473 males and 6592 females. It is surrounded by the Puthupally and Pampady panchayats. The village is rich in tapioca and rubber cultivation. It is about 13 kilometers from Kottayam. Many very deep wells or pits which are of very small diameter can be seen in Arannil Kunnu.  These pits might have been formed as a result of a meteorite shower in this area. As the meteorite fell in this area Meenadom got its name from veenadom

Etymology
It is said that the name "Meenadom" derives from "veenadom" as the meteorite fell down here. There are many temples and Christian churches in Meenadom. An important Christian celebration held in Meenadom is "Pampady Dayara", where the tomb of St. Kuriakose Gregorious of the Malankara Orthodox church is located.

Places of worship

Other Landmarks
There are about 7 schools, a Public Health Center, a Spinning Mill (PRICO), Public Libraries, an Ayurvedic Hospital, Homeo Clinic, Veterinary Clinic, Electricity Office, Telephone Exchange, National, Co-operative and Private banks, and one ITC in Meenadom.

References

External links

Villages in Kottayam district